Prasad Barve  is an Indian actor and dubbing voice actor. He is also a TV actor and occasional film actor. He speaks Marathi, Hindi and English.

Career
His first notable role was as Nihaal in Shree. Then he entered as a new intern in Dill Mill Gayye season 2. Both his roles are comical. He has acted in the movie Vishwavinayak as a child artist. He has also acted in many popular advertisements including Tata Sky. He had also appeared in SAB TV's serial, Pritam Pyare Aur Woh as the main character Pyaare. Along with these serials, he also played the supporting role in Colors's serial Mrs. Pammi Pyarelal.

Filmography

Films

Television

Dubbing career
Prasad is usually best known for voicing comic relief characters when it comes to dubbing foreign media and he very rarely does voiceover for serious characters. He has been voicing various different characters since he was 8. As he got a bit older, he first started with dubbing for Paul C. Scott as Reggie Williams in Small Wonder. He is also known for doing the Hindi voiceover for Orlando Brown as Eddie in That's So Raven on Disney Channel. Prasad has dubbed for the iconic character Vegeta in Dragon Ball Z and Ash Ketchum in Pokémon (Cartoon Network Dub). He has also done Hindi voiceover roles for famous cartoons like in Scooby-Doo, Stitch in Lilo & Stitch: The Series and Japanese anime like Perman 1 (Mitsuo Suwa) in Perman.

He has also lend his Hindi dubbing voice to Ivan in 2003 film, Barbie of Swan Lake and to Po in the Kung Fu Panda series.

Dubbing roles

Animated series

Live action television series

Live action films

Animated films

See also
Dubbing (filmmaking)
List of Indian Dubbing Artists

References

External links
 

1981 births
Indian male television actors
Indian male voice actors
Living people
Marathi people